The united front in Taiwan is an aspect of the Chinese Communist Party (CCP)'s larger united front strategy, applied to Taiwan, to achieve unification. It relies on the presence of pro-Beijing sympathizers in Taiwan combined with a carrot-and-stick approach of threatening war with Taiwan while offering opportunities for business and cultural exchanges.

In 2022, Taiwan's National Security Bureau chief stated that the Chinese Communist Party (CCP) and Government of China had provided training to local internet celebrities in "cognitive warfare" campaigns to spread propaganda.

According to Sinologist Gerry Groot, the CCP's abrogation of one country, two systems in Hong Kong "was noted in Taiwan, where it made the work of the tiny minority of pro-unification activists even harder and reinforced the skepticism of others regarding the value of CCP promises."

See also
Chinese unification
Cross-Strait relations
Political status of Taiwan
China Council for the Promotion of Peaceful National Reunification
Chinese Unification Promotion Party
Patriot Alliance Association
Taiwan People's Communist Party
United Front Work Department
United front (China)

References

Cross-Strait relations
Politics of Taiwan
Espionage in China
Taiwan
Chinese irredentism
Chinese foreign electoral intervention